Three-time defending champions Todd Woodbridge and Mark Woodforde defeated Byron Black and Grant Connell in the final, 4–6, 6–1, 6–3, 6–2 to win the gentlemen's doubles title at the 1996 Wimbledon Championships. It was their fourth Wimbledon title and sixth major title overall.

Seeds

  Todd Woodbridge /  Mark Woodforde (champions)
  Mark Knowles /  Daniel Nestor (third round)
  Byron Black /  Grant Connell (final)
  Guy Forget /  Jakob Hlasek (quarterfinals)
  Patrick Galbraith /  Andrei Olhovskiy (third round)
  Jacco Eltingh /  Paul Haarhuis (first round)
  Sébastien Lareau /  Alex O'Brien (third round)
  Ellis Ferreira /  Jan Siemerink (semifinals)
  Libor Pimek /  Byron Talbot (first round)
  Jonas Björkman /  Nicklas Kulti (quarterfinals)
  Mark Philippoussis /  Pat Rafter (semifinals)
  Tomás Carbonell /  Francisco Roig (second round)
  Marc-Kevin Goellner /  Yevgeny Kafelnikov (third round)
  Jared Palmer /  Jonathan Stark (second round)
  Jiří Novák /  David Rikl (second round)
  Hendrik Jan Davids /  Cyril Suk (second round)

Qualifying

Draw

Finals

Top half

Section 1

Section 2

Bottom half

Section 3

Section 4

References

External links

1996 Wimbledon Championships – Men's draws and results at the International Tennis Federation

Men's Doubles
Wimbledon Championship by year – Men's doubles